Politianus served  partas Greek Patriarch of Alexandria between 768 and 813. According to Eutychius, Politianus was a physician by training, visited Baghdad and healed Hārūn al-Rašīd’s concubine. He reportedly participated in the translation of Vindonius Anatolius of Berytus' "Collection of Agricultural Practices" from Greek into Arabic for Yahya ibn Khalid in 795 CE.

References
 

8th-century Patriarchs of Alexandria
9th-century Patriarchs of Alexandria
8th-century people from the Abbasid Caliphate
9th-century people from the Abbasid Caliphate
Greek–Arabic translators
Physicians from the Abbasid Caliphate